WBKW (1070 AM) is an alternative rock formatted broadcast radio station licensed to Beckley, West Virginia, serving Beckley and Oak Hill in West Virginia.  WBKW is owned and operated by Southern Communications.

History
First signed on in January 1967 as WCIR.

On December 25, 2017, the station flipped from Southern gospel to modern rock.

Translator

References

External links
 Channel 93.5 the Buzz Online

BKW
Radio stations established in 1967
1967 establishments in West Virginia
Alternative rock radio stations in the United States
BKW